InstaFund Racing is a Canadian women's road bicycle racing team which participates in elite women's races. The team was established in 2019.

Team roster

Major results
2021
UCI Track Cycling World Cup (Team Pursuit), Ngaire Barraclough

2022
Stage 4 Tour of the Gila, Maddy Ward

National Champions
2021
 Namibia Time Trial, Vera Adrian
 Namibia Road Race, Vera Adrian
 Israel Time Trial, Rotem Gafinovitz

References

External links

UCI Women's Teams
Cycling teams based in Canada
Cycling teams established in 2019